Tero Saarinen Company is a dance group founded in 1996 by its director, the Finnish dance artist and choreographer Tero Saarinen. The group's repertoire consists mainly of choreographies by Saarinen. The Company is based in Helsinki, although it mainly performs abroad. The group's rehearsal space and office are in the Alexander Theatre, where it also performs some of its small to midscale works.

Tero Saarinen Company is now considered one of Finland's leading cultural exports. By the end of 2016 the group had performed in 40 countries. Its main activities also include running an international teaching programme and participating in the creation of Saarinen's choreographies for other leading dance companies around the world. The group follows the network-centric organization model, and employs about 80 people each year, eleven of whom have permanent posts.

The company's own works are created as international co-productions, and include many of Saarinen's best known choreographies. Tero Saarinen's rich choreographic style is characterized by multidimensional artistry – expressive dancers, live music, and striking visuals. His distinctive movement language has been described as "organic", an "inventive mixture of grotesqueness and beauty" and "like Butoh with wings".

History
Tero Saarinen, a renowned international soloist, assembled the dance group Company Toothpick in 1995 as an instrument for expressing his own choreographic vision. Saarinen wanted to work on a more permanent basis with inspired artists who shared his values. The group's founding members, alongside Saarinen, were his colleague Henrikki Heikkilä from the Finnish National Ballet, Yuval Pick from Batsheva Dance Company, and Lighting Designer Mikki Kunttu. Company Toothpick was given a humorous name to commemorate the matchstick factory in Pori, where Saarinen was born.

The group's first piece, Westward Ho! premiered in Stockholm's Dansens Hus on 18 February 1996. In 1997 the group was invited to perform the piece at the first Aerowaves platform held at The Place Theatre in London. The performance marked Saarinen's international breakthrough as a choreographer, and the group began receiving invitations from all over Europe.

In 2000 Company Toothpick acquired office space in The Alexander Theatre. In 2001 the group took on its first full-time employee, when its current Managing Director Iiris Autio began working as Saarinen's manager and the group's producer. In 2002 the group changed its name to Tero Saarinen Company, and in 2004 it became eligible for regular state subsidy under the Finnish Theatre and Orchestra Act, and began receiving operational funding from both the Finnish State and the City of Helsinki.

Performances

Operations in Helsinki

The Alexander Theatre in Helsinki has been the company's home since 1999. Tero Saarinen Company has been the Alexander Theatre's official resident company since 2005. In addition to regular performances, the theatre houses the group's office and rehearsal space – the same studio where Tero Saarinen started his professional career in 1982, when the building was still the home of the Finnish National Ballet.

Tero Saarinen Company performs in Helsinki every year. In addition to the Alexander Theatre, venues include The Finnish National Opera and Finnish National Theatre. In addition to performances, the group's activities in Helsinki include teaching and community outreach projects.

Touring 
Tero Saarinen Company toured in 40 countries and on six continents during 1996-2016. The group's performances have earned a great deal of positive media response. Tero Saarinen's richly original choreographic style is characterized by his distinctive movement language and multidimensional artistry – expressive dancers, live music, and striking visuals. Saarinen has produced 46 original works altogether, 17 of them for his own group. (April 2018)

The group has performed in venues and at events including: Maison de la danse in Lyon; Théâtre du Châtelet and Théâtre National de Chaillot in Paris; the Movimentos festival in Wolfsburg; Tanz im August in Berlin; Kampnagel in Hamburg; The Joyce Theater; New York City Center; and BAM (Brooklyn Academy of Music; Howard Gilman Opera House) in New York; Jacob's Pillow Dance Festival in Becket, Massachusetts; Walt Disney Concert Hall in Los Angeles; Southbank Centre in London; Chekhov International Theatre Festival in Moscow; Alexandrinsky Theatre in Saint Petersburg; The Ibero-American Theater Festival in Bogota; Festival Internacional de Buenos Aires in Argentina; SIDance in Seoul; Perth International Arts Festival in Perth, Australia; and New Zealand International Arts Festival in Wellington.

Most of the group's works are produced as international co-productions. Co-producers include: The Joyce Theatre (USA); Automne en Normandie (France); Maison de la danse (France); Venice Biennale (Italy); Southbank Centre (UK); Dansens Hus (Sweden); and Kuopio Dance Festival (Finland).

Premieres

Tero Saarinen Company has staged a total of 17 original works by Saarinen, and has also incorporated into its repertoire some of Saarinen's other works, along with solo pieces given to Saarinen by Carolyn Carlson.
Tero Saarinen Company's key works include: the company's breakthrough opus Westward Ho! (1996); Saarinen's Stravinsky works Petrushka (2001) and HUNT (2002); the Shaker inspired Borrowed Light (2004), "Morphed" (2014) set to the music of Esa-Pekka Salonen and "Kullervo", a large-scale co-production with The Finnish National Opera and Ballet featuring the music of Jean Sibelius.

The solo piece HUNT (2002), a collaboration with Multimedia Artist Marita Liulia, has attracted exceptional international attention. By the end of 2013 Saarinen will have performed this piece 174 times in 82 cities and 32 countries, in Asia, Africa, South and North America, and Europe, and it has been dubbed one of the most significant choreographies made for Stravinsky's The Rite of Spring. Tero Saarinen ceased performing the piece in 2013, after the centennial of The Rite.
Borrowed Light, performed at dozens of leading venues in Europe, Oceania and North America since its creation in 2004, has also attracted critical acclaim in the international media. For instance, The Village Voice in the USA listed it as one of The Decade's Best Dance Performances.

Teaching programme

Ever since its foundation, Tero Saarinen Company's operations have included an international teaching programme. Nowadays courses and workshops for professional dancers and advanced level dance students are held all over the world, approximately four to five times a year.

Tero Saarinen's movement language is based on the movement technique that he developed himself, drawing influences from Butoh, ballet, Western modern dance, as well as martial arts. One prominent feature of his mode of expression is the use of the eyes and hands, which are important in Asian dance traditions.  His style has been described as an organic and innovative mixture of beauty and the grotesque.

The teaching of the technique for Saarinen's movement language concentrates on awakening the dancer's senses and general alertness, as well as activating their nerve endings, and acknowledging and using the body's own weight. The aim is to maximize the dancers’ capacity to use balance and off balance. The pedagogy focuses on internalizing the movement and the dancer's personal interpretation, aided by mental visualization techniques.
Alongside Saarinen, the Head of Artistic Development Sini Länsivuori is in charge of developing the company's teaching operations.

Operations

Organization

The company functions as a network organization and has eleven permanent employees. In addition, each year some 40 to 80 professionals from different fields and various parts of the world also work with the group on specific productions or out-of-house service contracts. Tero Saarinen Company uses shared leadership; the management is divided up so that Tero Saarinen is in charge of the artistic content and Managing Director Iiris Autio is in charge of production, managing and finances. The group is supported by a registered non-profit association, a host organization called Into liikkeessä (Passion in Motion).

The primary aim of Tero Saarinen Company has been defined as to "promote a humane worldview and basic human values through the language of dance, while also increasing people’s understanding of their own physicality and its significance for a good life."

The group's artistic aim is to use choreography, music and visual design to give people profound experiences in the form of enduring, total artworks – open, interactive situations that allow audience members to address fundamental human questions. The group's basic values are: a sense of community, openness, uncompromising quality, and an appreciation of hard work and entrepreneurship.

Ville Konttinen is the group's Technical Director. Dancer Henrikki Heikkilä is the group's Rehearsal Director and Dancer Sini Länsivuori also acts as the Head of Artistic Development. The Company Manager is Maiju Ristilä, Head of International Sales Johanna Rajamäki, Head of Marketing and Communications is Terhi Mikkonen, and the Production Coordinator is Carita Weissenfelt.

Funding
In 2004 Tero Saarinen Company became eligible for regular state subsidy under the Finnish Theatre and Orchestra Act. Between 2006 and 2016, State subsidies accounted for an average of 35 per cent, and operating subsidies from the City of Helsinki about 7 per cent of the group's entire budget.

Dancers
Tero Saarinen Company has always employed strong, expressive dancers. In its early stages, these included Saarinen's renowned colleagues from the Finnish National Ballet, such as Henrikki Heikkilä, Sini Länsivuori, Anu Sistonen and Heikki Vienola – the majority of whom are still working with the company. A number of prominent foreign dancers have also visited the group, among them Yuval Pick, Nataša Novotná, Megumi Nakamura and Sharon Eyal. Currently most of the dancers are Finnish.

Dancers, in addition to Tero Saarinen, featured in works in the group's current repertoire (year joined):
Satu Halttunen (1999–)
Henrikki Heikkilä (1996–)
Annika Hyvärinen (2011–)
Ima Iduozee (2013–)
Leo Kirjonen (2013–)
Carl Knif (2004–)
Saku Koistinen (2007–)
Mikko Lampinen (2011–)
Jarkko Lehmus (2011–)
Ninu Lindfors (2004–)
Natasha Lommi (2011–)
Pekka Louhio (2009–)
Sini Länsivuori (1998–)
Jussi Nousiainen (2013–)
Maria Nurmela (2003–)
David Scarantino (2013–)
Heikki Vienola (2003–)
Won Won-Myeong (2017–)

Artistic collaborators
Tero Saarinen Company's works can be defined as comprehensive artworks: in addition to the choreography and interpretation, both music and visual presentation are important components in Saarinen's works. Among Saarinen's trusted collaborators are lighting designer Mikki Kunttu and costume designer Erika Turunen. Saarinen makes use of live music in many of his works. His musical collaborators include The Boston Camerata, Ensemble InterContemporain, the accordion duo James Crabb and Geir Draugsvoll, the chamber orchestra Avanti!, composer-musician Jarmo Saari and Finnish accordionist Kimmo Pohjonen. Saarinen has created numerous works for other dance groups. The Dutch Nederlands Dans Theater (NDT1), the French ballets of Lyon, Marseille and Lorraine, the Portuguese Ballet Gulbekian, the Israeli Batsheva Dance Company, the Swedish Gothenburg opera Ballet, and the Finnish National Ballet, and others, have featured Saarinen's works in their repertoires.

References

External links
 Official website
 Tero Saarinen Company in the Finnish Dance Database

Contemporary dance companies